Baby Don't Cry may refer to:
"Baby Don't Cry (Keep Ya Head Up II)", a posthumous 1999 single by American rapper Tupac Shakur
"Baby Don't Cry" (Namie Amuro song), a 2007 single by Japanese pop and R&B singer Namie Amuro
"Baby Don't Cry" (INXS song), a 1992 single by Australian rock band INXS
"Baby Don't Cry" (One Horse Blue song), a 1994 single by Canadian country music band One Horse Blue
"Baby, Don't Cry" (Exo song), a track from Exo's album XOXO

See also
 "Don't Cry Baby", a song written by Saul Bernie, James P. Johnson and Stella Unger, originally performed by Bessie Smith